= Khera, Kapurthala =

Khera
- Village
- Country: India
- State: Punjab
- District: Kapurthala
- Tehsil: Phagwara

Government
  - Type: Panchayat raj
  - Body: Gram panchayat

Area
  - Total: 129.55 ha (320.1 acres)

Population (2011)
  - Total: 2,398; 1,200/1,198 ♂/♀
  - Scheduled Castes: 1,257; 652/605 ♂/♀
  - Total Households: 517

Languages
  - Official: Punjabi
- Time zone: UTC+5:30 (IST)
- ISO 3166 code: IN-PB
- Website: kapurthala.gov.in

Khera is a village in Phagwara in Kapurthala district of Punjab State, India. It is located 3 kilometres (1.9 mi) from the sub-district headquarters and 43 kilometres (27 mi) from the district headquarters. The village is administered by a Sarpanch who is an elected representative of the village.

== Demography ==
As of 2011, The village has a total number of 517 houses and the population of 2398 of which 1200 are males while 1198 are females. According to the report published by Census India in 2011, out of the total population of the village 1257 people are from Schedule Caste and the village does not have any Schedule Tribe population so far.

== See also ==
- List of villages in India
